The National Thanksgiving Turkey Presentation is a ceremony that takes place at the White House every year shortly before Thanksgiving. The president of the United States is presented with a live domestic turkey by the National Turkey Federation (NTF), usually males of the Broad Breasted White variety. The early years also included a joint presentation with the Poultry and Egg National Board. The ceremony dates back to the 1940s; these turkeys were usually slaughtered and eaten (with some exceptions) prior to the 1970s, when it became standard practice to spare the turkey. During the Presidency of George H. W. Bush, it became a tradition (since carried on by all of Bush's successors) for the president to issue a ceremonial "pardon" to the turkey. It is a tradition that the turkeys be picked from the chairperson of the NTF's home state, occasionally from the chair's own farm.

History
 Turkeys had been donated to the President as gifts from private citizens. Horace Vose, a Rhode Island turkey farmer, presented a dressed turkey to the President each year from 1873 until his death in 1913. In 1913, South Trimble, a Kentucky farmer and Clerk of the United States House of Representatives,  presented a turkey to then-President Woodrow Wilson that year, convinced that his red pepper-fed but smaller turkey tasted better than Vose's; no record survives of which turkey Wilson chose. This, along with Vose's death that December, set off a free-for-all in which numerous farmers tried to be the one to supply the annual holiday turkeys to the President. The rivalry escalated in the Roaring Twenties, with a group of women Warren G. Harding supporters from Chicago sending Harding turkeys (including in 1920 when he was still President-Elect and at the Panama Canal Zone; the turkey was delivered by train), while Cuero, Texas also sent Wilson and Harding turkeys. The Cuero turkeys were notable for being the first to be sent while still alive; the Wilson administration slaughtered and ate the bird. Calvin Coolidge, alarmed at the number of turkeys being offered to the President at the time, briefly stopped the tradition upon assuming office in 1923 and chose to buy his own turkey; he relented in 1925 and was soon bombarded with an unusual array of animals to eat, including Rebecca, a live raccoon that Coolidge received in 1926 and, unwilling to eat it, designated as a White House pet.

The official presentation of a turkey to the President each year began in 1947 under President Harry S. Truman. The presentation was partially born out of a lobbying campaign: the Truman Administration, in an effort to conserve grain for foreign aid campaigns, began promoting "Meatless Tuesdays" and "Poultryless Thursdays" in the autumn of 1947. Not only did American citizens quickly grow frustrated with the (voluntary, but strongly encouraged) restrictions and begin disregarding them in short order, the National Poultry and Egg Board, incensed at the attack on their industry, noted that not only was Thanksgiving on a Thursday (thus making the annual Thanksgiving turkey a taboo), but Christmas and New Year's Day also landed on a Thursday that year. A truce was called in the dispute in early November, before the Thanksgiving holiday, but "Eggless Thursdays" continued to be promoted for the rest of the year, meaning that pumpkin pie, another Thanksgiving staple, was still on the forbidden foods list. Records on file at the Truman Library show that Truman publicly admitted eating at least some of the turkeys.

The Eisenhower Presidential Library says documents in their collection reveal that President Dwight Eisenhower ate the birds presented to him during his two terms. President John F. Kennedy spontaneously spared a turkey on November 19, 1963, just three days before his assassination. The bird was wearing a sign reading, "Good Eating Mr. President". Kennedy returned the massive  turkey to the farm, saying "we'll let this one grow." Scattered reports in The Washington Post and Los Angeles Times referred to it as a pardon, but Kennedy did not refer to it as such. Likewise, Richard Nixon also spared some of the turkeys given to him during his time as president. During the Carter administration, First Lady Rosalynn Carter arranged to have the turkeys sent to petting zoos, and no public ceremonies were held.

The first President on record issuing a "pardon" to his turkey was Ronald Reagan. Reagan had been sending the turkeys presented to him to farms and zoos since at least 1982, and 1987's turkey, Charlie, was likewise headed to a petting zoo. At the time, Reagan was facing questions over the Iran-Contra affair, on whether or not he would consider pardoning Oliver North (who had yet to be tried for his involvement in the affair); Reagan conjured the notion of the turkey pardon as a joke to deflect those questions. Reagan did not make any pardon references in the 1988 presentation, but his successor, George H. W. Bush, instituted the turkey pardon as a permanent part of the presentation beginning his first year in office, 1989. The phrase "presidential pardon" in that ceremony was apparently inserted by a speechwriter; Bush initially was indifferent to the terminology, saying Reprieve', 'keep him going', or 'pardon': it's all the same for the turkey, as long as he doesn't end up on the president's holiday table."

For many years the turkeys were sent to Frying Pan Farm Park in Fairfax County, Virginia. From 2005 to 2009, the pardoned turkeys were sent to either the Disneyland Resort in California or the Walt Disney World Resort in Florida, where they served as the honorary grand marshals of Disney's Thanksgiving Day Parade. In 2010, 2011 and 2012, the turkeys were sent to live at Mount Vernon, the estate and home of George Washington; Mount Vernon stopped displaying and accepting the turkeys due to the fact that they violated the estate's policy of maintaining its own historical accuracy (Washington never farmed turkeys). The 2013, 2014 and 2015 turkeys were sent to Morven Park in Leesburg, Virginia, the estate of former Virginia governor (and prolific turkey farmer) Westmoreland Davis. Virginia Tech has housed the turkeys from 2016 to 2019; Virginia Tech was chosen because of the college's poultry science program, and the National Turkey Federation wanted to begin a tradition of cooperation between the turkey industry and universities. After four successful years at Virginia Tech, the alma mater of the chairman of the NTF at the time, the federation chose to begin housing the turkeys at universities closer to the turkeys' home towns. The 2020 turkeys were sent to be housed at Iowa State University, the 2021 turkeys reside at Purdue University and the 2022 turkeys will live at North Carolina State University.

Selection process
The turkeys are raised in the same fashion as turkeys designated for slaughter and are fed a grain-heavy diet of fortified corn and soybeans to increase the birds' size. A flock of between 50 and 80 birds, typically from the farm of the current National Turkey Federation chairperson, are selected to be acclimated to handle loud noises, flash photography and large crowds; from the flock, the 10 to 20 best-preened and best-behaved are chosen and eventually narrowed down to two finalists, whose names are chosen by the White House staff from suggestions by school children from the state where they were raised. The two finalists are then transported to Washington, where they stay at the Willard InterContinental Washington Hotel at National Turkey Federation expense before being pardoned in a ceremony at the White House. Turkey hens are usually marketed at 14 weeks and weigh  when processed. The turkeys for the National Thanksgiving Turkey Presentation are usually 21 week-old toms (males) weighing  by the time of their White House visit, compared to the shorter growing period for turkeys destined for market.

Broad Breasted White turkeys are bred for large size, are sedentary animals and have a predilection for overeating, making them prone to health problems associated with obesity such as heart disease, respiratory failure, joint damage and reduced life spans compared to wild or heritage turkeys. For many years, the pardoned turkeys were documented to have very short lives after their pardoning, frequently dying within a year of being pardoned; for comparison, heritage turkey breeds have lifespans on par with those of wild turkeys, at least five years. The lifespans of the pardoned turkeys have steadily improved in recent years, frequently having lifespans of over two years and occasionally reaching three years of age, an improvement attributed to better choices of homes after the pardons; rather than serving solely as tourist attractions, the turkeys are now placed in the care of experts who make conscious efforts to maintain the turkeys' health for as long as possible.

List of turkeys pardoned

Reagan Presidency
 1984: "Robust and Juicy" (R.J.), a 53-pound turkey grown by John Hendricks of Shelby, North Carolina.
 1987: "Charlie", the first "pardoned" turkey, was sent to a petting zoo in 1987.
 1988: "Woody", a National Turkey Federation turkey raised in Story City, Iowa

Clinton Presidency
 1994: Tom, a  turkey from Harrisonburg, Virginia.
 1996: Carl, a  turkey.
 1997: An unnamed  turkey from Raeford, North Carolina.
 1998: An unnamed  turkey.
 1999: "Harry the Turkey".
 2000: "Jerry the Turkey", a  bird from Barron, Wisconsin. The pardoned turkey (the eighth in Clinton's presidency) and its unnamed alternate were both sent to Kidwell Farm's petting zoo in Herndon, Virginia.

George W. Bush Presidency
 2001: Liberty and his back-up Freedom, so named in the wake of the 9/11 attacks.
 2002: Katie, the first-ever female turkey pardoned. The  bird bred by Ron Prestage, chairman of the National Turkey Federation, as well as alternate bird Zack. The turkeys were named after Prestage's children.
 2003: Stars and backup Stripes.
 2004: Biscuits and backup Gravy.
 2005: Marshmallow and alternate bird Yam, raised in Henning, Minnesota. Beginning in 2005 pardoned birds were sent to Disneyland to live, and serve as the "honorary grand marshal" of that year's Thanksgiving's Day parade, following concerns raised by animal rights groups that the birds had not survived for long. For the previous 15 years they had been sent to Frying Pan Farm Park near Herndon, Virginia. Names were generally chosen in online votes taken at the White House website.
 2006: Flyer and alternate bird Fryer, raised in Missouri.
 2007:  May and backup Flower, raised in Indiana.
 2008:  backup "vice" turkey named Pumpkin, after the number one turkey Pecan fell ill the night before the ceremony. Both turkeys were allowed to live.

Obama Presidency
 2009: Courage, a 45-pound turkey provided by the National Turkey Federation, and alternate bird Carolina, raised in North Carolina. Passing away in 2016, Courage lived to be over 6 years of age, an unusual feat for any turkey but especially commercial breeds. A spokesperson for Disneyland, where Courage was sent to spend his remaining years, credits his long life to changing the bird's diet from the typical soy- and corn-heavy feed of commercial farms to a more balanced natural diet, allowing him to lose much of the excess weight that causes strain to both the limbs and organs of these birds.
 2010: Apple, a 45-pound turkey from Foster Farms in Modesto, California; and alternate bird Cider. Both had died of natural causes by Thanksgiving 2011.
 2011: A 45-pound turkey named Liberty and an alternate bird named Peace, both of which were raised in Willmar, Minnesota. Peace survived until shortly before Thanksgiving 2012, when he was euthanized. Liberty survived until being euthanized April 26, 2013 at the age of 2.
 2012: Cobbler and Gobbler, both  turkeys from Rockingham County, Virginia. Gobbler died suddenly in February 2013; Cobbler was euthanized on August 22 of that year.
 2013: Popcorn, a  turkey from Badger, Minnesota. Popcorn won an online contest over its identically sized stablemate Caramel, which was also spared. Popcorn died of heatstroke in summer 2014. Caramel survived much longer; it outlived one of the next year's turkeys and did not die until October 2015, spending most of its two years of life at Morven Park as the companion of a brown heritage turkey named Franklin.
 2014: Cheese and alternate bird Mac, both of which were  turkeys from Fort Recovery, Ohio. Mac died of suspected heatstroke in July 2015; Cheese remained alive as of November 2015, with the surviving Franklin as its companion. Cheese was implied dead some time before November 2017, as the Morven Park website mentioned only housing the 2015 turkeys by that time.
 2015: Abe, a  turkey again presented by Foster Farms. The alternate was  Honest. Morven Park reported that both were still alive as of November 2016 and were still listed as alive on Morven Park's Web site in November 2017. In 2018, Morven Park's website mentioned the final departure of the 2015 pardoned turkeys happening in December 2017; by January 2019, they had removed all mention of them on their Turkey Hill Farm page.
 2016: Tater and Tot, 40-pound and 39½-pound (18 kg respectively) turkeys from Storm Lake, Iowa. Both were reported as still alive and healthy but showing signs of old age as of November 2017. The birds died some time before November 2018; Tater was later revealed to have been euthanized for a leg problem at age .

Trump Presidency
 2017: Drumstick, a  turkey, who was chosen over alternate Wishbone, a  turkey; both were from Alexandria, Minnesota. There are conflicting reports regarding the fate of the turkeys: Fox News claimed both turkeys were still alive and living a "lavish life" as of November 2018, while The Guardian claimed that both were dead. CNN confirmed that both had died by November 2019. Two pre-slaughtered turkeys from Orefield, Pennsylvania were also presented, with those turkeys being donated to Martha's Table.
 2018: Peas, a  turkey with a height of 30", chosen over Carrots, a  turkey with a height of 32", both from Huron, South Dakota were pardoned in 2018. Both were hatched on June 28, 2018. Both Peas and Carrots were still alive in November 2020.
 2019: Butter, a  turkey with a height of 31", chosen over Bread, a  turkey with a height of 32". Both were from Butterball contract farmer Wellie Jackson of Clinton, North Carolina. The pre-slaughtered turkeys again came from Orefield, Pennsylvania. Both Bread and Butter were still alive in November 2020.
 2020: Corn, chosen over Cob, owned by Ron and Susie Kardel of West Liberty Foods in West Liberty, Iowa. Both were still alive in November 2021.

Biden Presidency
 2021: Peanut Butter and Jelly, both  turkeys raised by Andrea Welp of Jasper, Indiana. As of June 2022, both were still alive, with Purdue stating that the birds had made a "smooth adjustment" to retirement.
 2022: Chocolate, a  turkey, chosen along with Chip, a  turkey, both raised by NTF chairman Ronnie Parker at Circle S Ranch in Monroe, North Carolina.

State ceremonies
A number of U.S. states have similar turkey-pardoning events, including Minnesota. The pardoning ceremonies have also been extended to other holidays; for instance, Erie County, New York's county executive facetiously pardons a butter lamb during Holy Week.

Popular culture
In The West Wing episode "Shibboleth," when C.J. learns the alternate turkey is to be slaughtered, she appeals to President Bartlet to save it. He points out that he cannot pardon a turkey, as it had committed no crime and he has no "judicial jurisdiction over birds". So, he drafts the turkey into military service to spare its life. In real life, both the turkey and the alternate are spared.

The animated film Free Birds centers around a turkey who was pardoned, then is recruited to go back in time in an attempt to change history and remove turkey from the menu of the first Thanksgiving dinner at Plymouth Colony.

In David Mamet's play November, an incumbent president losing his bid for reelection uses the yearly tradition to extort the turkey farmers to add to his lacking campaign fund.

In the Rick and Morty episode "Rick & Morty's Thanksploitation Spectacular", Rick turns himself into a turkey in an effort to receive a presidential pardon from the President.

Gallery

References

External links

 Information about the presidential turkey at the National Turkey Federation website
 Official photo gallery of Presidents pardoning Turkeys
 President Abraham Lincoln Pardoned Jack, the White House Turkey
 Truman Trivia: Did Truman pardon a Turkey?
 The Ungobbled Gobbler

Thanksgiving (United States)
Animal rights
 
Animals in politics
Poultry
Ceremonies in the United States
Articles containing video clips